Porąbka may refer to the following places:
Porąbka, Limanowa County in Lesser Poland Voivodeship (south Poland)
Porąbka, Olkusz County in Lesser Poland Voivodeship (south Poland)
Porąbka, Silesian Voivodeship (south Poland)
Porąbka, Łobez County in West Pomeranian Voivodeship (north-west Poland)
Porąbka, Świdwin County in West Pomeranian Voivodeship (north-west Poland)